Louie the Laker is the mascot of Grand Valley State University, located in Allendale, Michigan. The costume of Louie consists of a large cartoonish face with an oversized jaw, a scowl, a blue and white striped shirt, blue pants, a blue captain's hat, and large black boots. He is seen at all football games as well as randomly around campus during events.  According to short videos shown at Laker football games, Louie the Laker sleeps on the 50 yard line and dreams of Laker football.

History

With the first three men's teams (Golf, Basketball, and Tennis) entering intercollegiate athletics, Grand Valley State College (GVSC) asked the general public for help in 1965 while looking for an official mascot to represent the school. Before entering official sports competitions, Grand Valley's teams were unofficially known as the Bruisers because of the blue, black, and white color scheme. GVSC's United College Organization (UCO) selected six finalists submitted by the public for the official mascot to be selected by an overall student vote. The names chosen were the Bruisers, Warriors, Bluejays, Ottawas, Archers, and Voyagers. After a seven-hour vote, Grand Valley students selected a late write-in vote submitted by sophomore Annie Kate McDonald from Grand Haven, Michigan. Students voted the dark-horse candidate, Lakers, as the official name over the six options proposed by UCO. After all the votes had been gathered, the write-in name Lakers finished 11 votes ahead of second-place Voyagers.

In 1996, athletic director Tim Selgo and Rob 'Odie' Odejewski came together to develop an official name and character to represent the GVSU Lakers. Prior to the idea to develop an official character for the mascot, the Lakers were represented by the Old Man and the Sea costume in the early-1990s as well as various other nautical-themed mascots in the 1970s and 1980s. Selgo and Odejewski came up with the idea to officially name the mascot "Louie" and were encouraged by Ron VanSteeland, then Vice President for Finance and Administration, to brand the character to be the face of Laker sports. Since his inception, Louie the Laker has been the subject of some minor alterations but still remains one of the most visible identities for Grand Valley and its athletic programs. Louie the Laker's appearance was loosely based on Louis VanTressel a fallen oiler aboard the legendary S.S. Edmund Fitzgerald.

Controversies

After Grand Valley played in the 2001 NCAA Division II National Championship in football, John Butler, president of the Peoria Rivermen (an East Coast Hockey League franchise), accused Grand Valley of trademark infringement for the use of the Louie logo.  Butler's four-year-old son, Jack, saw Louie during the championship game's television broadcast and brought the similarity to his father's attention.  Louie closely resembled the ECHL Rivermen's own logo, a sailor dressed similarly to Louie chewing on a hockey puck. Grand Valley made some modifications to the logo which met the Rivermen's approval, bringing the matter to a mutually satisfactory ending, in order to avoid legal ramifications.

References
"GVSU unveils new athletics logo.(Sports)." The Grand Rapids Press (Grand Rapids, MI) (July 31, 2002): E3. Grand Rapids Press. Thomson Gale. Grand Valley State University.

Grand Valley State University
College mascots in the United States
Allendale, Michigan